Parliamentary elections were held in the People's Socialist Republic of Albania on 1 February 1987. The Democratic Front, a mass organization of the Party of Labour of Albania, was the only political force able to contest the elections, and subsequently won all 250 seats. Voter turnout was reported to be 100%, with all registered voters voting. A single ballot, which was characterized by The Guardian's Simon Tisdall as belonging to "a lone voice of protest", was voided: the Albanian Telegraphic Agency stated that it was invalid and made no further comment.

Results

References

Parliamentary elections in Albania
Albania
Parliamentary election
One-party elections
Single-candidate elections
Albania